This is a list of Romanian football transfers for the 2011–12 transfer windows. Only moves featuring at least one Liga I club are listed.

Transfers

Summer window

Notes and references

Romania
2011
Transfers